The Ohio Glory were a professional American football team in NFL Europe. They played one season (1992) in the World League of American Football, which later became NFL Europe.

Columbus, Ohio, was awarded the WLAF franchise after the Raleigh-Durham Skyhawks posted an 0-10 season.  Ohio did not do much better, posting a 1-9 record after one season of play.  The sole win came at the expense of the Frankfurt Galaxy in week 7, a 20-17 victory in Columbus.

The Glory played their home games in Ohio Stadium on The Ohio State University's campus, which at the time had a seating capacity of 91,470 (now 102,082).  Their head coach was Larry Little, and they participated in the North American East division.  Their first draft pick was former NFL quarterback Babe Laufenberg. Their second pick was RB/LB Jason Palmer 1991 1st team from Ohio.

Season-by-season

Schedule
Week 1: Orlando Thunder 13, Ohio 9

Week 2: Sacramento Surge 17, Ohio 6

Week 3: Orlando Thunder 28, Ohio 3

Week 4: Montreal Machine 31, Ohio 20

Week 5: San Antonio Riders 17, Ohio 0

Week 6: Barcelona Dragons 20, Ohio 10

Week 7: Ohio 20, Frankfurt Galaxy 17

Week 8: New York/New Jersey Knights 39, Ohio 33 (OT)

Week 9: Sacramento Surge 21, Ohio 7

Week 10: Birmingham Fire 27, Ohio 24

Personnel

Staff

Roster

References

External links
Ohio Glory Information

 
American football teams established in 1992
American football teams disestablished in 1992
1992 establishments in Ohio
Defunct American football teams in Ohio
1992 disestablishments in Ohio
American football teams in Columbus, Ohio
NFL Europe (WLAF) teams